is a Japanese professional baseball pitcher for the Tokyo Yakult Swallows of Nippon Professional Baseball (NPB).

Professional career

Yomiuri Giants
On October 24, 2013, Taguchi was drafted by the Yomiuri Giants in the 2013 Nippon Professional Baseball draft.

On April 11, 2015, He debuted in the Central League against the Tokyo Yakult Swallows, and recorded his first win.

On November 16, 2018, he was selected Yomiuri Giants roster at the 2018 MLB Japan All-Star Series exhibition game against MLB All-Stars. On February 27, 2019, he was selected for Japan national baseball team at the 2019 exhibition games against Mexico. On October 1, 2019, he was selected at the 2019 WBSC Premier12.

Tokyo Yakult Swallows
On March 1, 2021, Taguchi was traded to the Tokyo Yakult Swallows.

References

External links

 NPB.jp

1995 births
Living people
Japanese baseball players
Nippon Professional Baseball pitchers
Baseball people from Hiroshima Prefecture
Yomiuri Giants players
Tokyo Yakult Swallows players
2019 WBSC Premier12 players